Paramjit Singh (born December 30, 1952 ) is an Indian basketball player who competed in the 1980 Olympics. He was also the captain of the Indian basketball team at the Olympics.

References

External links
 

Living people
1952 births
Indian men's basketball players
Basketball players at the 1980 Summer Olympics
Olympic basketball players of India
Place of birth missing (living people)